Blenheim is an unincorporated community located within Gloucester Township, in Camden County, New Jersey, United States. Blenheim contributed to the township's early growth, as well as nearby Erial and Sicklerville.

Blenheim is named after Blenheim, Germany.

References

Gloucester Township, New Jersey
Unincorporated communities in Camden County, New Jersey
Unincorporated communities in New Jersey